Mambo Graphics (also, 100% Mambo; and marketed as Mambo) is an Australian company designer of clothing. The company produces and commercialises surfing wetsuits, and casual wear clothing. Mambo was launched in 1984 by musician Dare Jennings and business partner, Andrew Rich in the Sydney suburb of Alexandria. On January 6, 2015, Mambo was acquired by American company Saban Brands. In July 2019 Mambo was brought back to Australian ownership when it was acquired by Caprice Australia.

Mambo is sold across Australia and New Zealand and, in 2011, entered the United States and Canada and has opened Mambo stores in the UK. The first pair of board shorts was created by an English designer Paul Smith. Peter Pilotto and other designers inspired the female wetsuits.

History

Early days 
In the early 1970s Dare Jennings owned a large and successful screen printing business, Phantom Textile Printers, producing t-shirt and fabric prints for a variety of commercial clients. He also owned an independent record label, Phantom Records.

Mambo began life as an "after-hours" project in the Phantom art room. The graphics were initially created by in-house artists such as musician Jodi Phillis, and by freelance artist, Richard Allan whose first t-shirt graphics, 'Real Wrestlers, Real Wrestling' and 'Call Of The Wild (Farting Dog)' were the best-sellers.

'100% Mambo' clothing was often available in surf / skate shops in the mid- to late 1980s in the UK. As skateboarders wore a lot of surfer-inspired clothing, Mambo board shorts in loud / Hawaiian patterns were worn by skaters. Other similar surf / skate brands around at the time were Stüssy, Life's A Beach and Vision Street Wear. As this was long before skate culture became mainstream (e.g. skate shops often only sold Vans, Vision or Converse shoes), these were usually niche products.

Allan's arrival at Mambo was followed by other Australian and overseas artists, including Reg Mombassa, Robert Williams (US) and Ben Frost.

Development 

In 1994, the first Mambo 'Loud Shirt' was released. The design was influenced by the famous Hawaiian 'Aloha' shirt. It was called 'Blue Hawaii' by Martin Plaza (a bandmate of Reg Mombassa). This shirt became one of Mambo's best-sellers and started the Mambo 'Loud Shirt' style.

Mambo opened its first store in 1995. Located in the Sydney suburb of Paddington, it was called the 'Mambo Friendship Store'. Stores opened in other Australian cities and in the UK, Europe, Asia and New Zealand. By 2001, Mambo had opened 25 independent retail stores.

In 2000 Mambo received an invitation from the Australian Wool Board to design the athlete's uniform for the opening ceremony of the 2000 Summer Olympics in Sydney.

After the Summer Olympic Games, Jennings was approached by Gazal Corporation to buy the brand. Jennings sold the company in March of that year and took over the role of creative director. Jennings left the company in 2002 and later went on to create the surf and moto-inspired brand Deus Ex Machina.

In 2006, Principle (an Australian research company) named Mambo "Australia's sixth-most-authentic brand" alongside Bonds, Speedo, R. M. Williams and Billabong.

In 2008 Mambo was sold to The Nervous Investor Group, an Australian-based consortium headed by Angus Kingsmill and based in the Sydney beachside suburb of Manly.

In 2015 Mambo was sold to US clothing group Saban Brands.

In 2012, Mambo entered into partnerships with key players in the US and Brazil with plans to introduce the brand on a large scale in each country.

In July 2019, Mambo was acquired by 60-year-old family-run brand Caprice Australia, bringing ownership of the Mambo brand to Australia.

See also

 List of swimwear brands

References

External links
 

Australian brands
Clothing companies of Australia
Surfwear brands
Cycle manufacturers of Australia
Snowboarding companies
Skateboarding companies
Swimwear manufacturers
Clothing retailers of Australia
Companies based in Sydney
Design companies established in 1984
Australian companies established in 1984
Kick scooters